The Israel national badminton team represents Israel in international badminton team competitions. The Israel Badminton Association controls the national team and the players' ability to join tournaments.

Israel participated in the 2019 Sudirman Cup and were placed into Group 3B, along with Canada, Germany and Singapore. The team faced the United States in the knockout stage and lost the tie 1-3. The team finished in 20th place. The men's and women's team participated in the European Men's and Women's Team Badminton Championships.

Israel also participates in para-badminton. Its national players Amir Levi and Nina Gorodetzky are world number one in the mixed doubles WH1-WH2 discipline.

Participation in BWF competitions

Sudirman Cup

Participation in European Team Badminton Championships

Men's Team

Women's Team

Mixed Team

Participation in Helvetia Cup

Participation in European Junior Team Badminton Championships
Mixed Team

Players 
The following players were selected to represent Israel at the 2020 European Men's and Women's Team Badminton Championships.

Men
Misha Zilberman
Ariel Shainski
Yonathan Levit
Ofir Belenki
Shoni Schwartzman
May Bar Netzer
Maxim Grinblat

Women
Ksenia Polikarpova
Dana Danilenko
Anastasia Bantish
Heli Neiman
Yuval Pugach
Shery Rotshtein
Margeret Lurie

References

Badminton
National badminton teams
Badminton in Israel